Aranyosapáti is a village in Szabolcs-Szatmár-Bereg county, in the Northern Great Plain region of eastern Hungary. János Pataki, the paternal grandfather of former governor of the State of New York, George Pataki, was from Aranyosapáti.

Aranyosapáti was established in 1950 after the unification of two villages: Kopócsapáti and Révaranyos.
Jews lived in both villages until they were murdered by the Nazis in the Holocaust.

Geography

References

Populated places in Szabolcs-Szatmár-Bereg County